Brazil women's national goalball team is the women's national team of Brazil.  Goalball is a team sport designed specifically for athletes with a vision impairment.  The team takes part in international goalball competitions.

Paralympic Games

2004 Athens 

The team competed in 2004 Summer Paralympics, between 17 and 28 September 2004, in the Faliro Sports Pavilion Arena, Athens, Greece.  The team finished seventh.

2008 Beijing 

The team competed in 2008 Summer Paralympics, from 6 to 17 September 2008, in the Beijing Institute of Technology Gymnasium 'bat wing' arena, Beijing, China.  They did not reach the quarter-finals of the eight teams.

2012 London 

The team competed in the 2012 Summer Paralympics from 30 August to 7 September 2012, in the Copper Box Arena, London, England.  In Group A, they were beaten by Japan 0:2 in the quarter-finals.

Athletes were Claudia Paula de Amorim Oliveira, Gleyse Priscila Portioli de Souza, Marcia Bonfim Vieira dos Santos, Denise Daniele Batista de Souza, Ana Carolina Duarte Ruas Custodio, and Neusimar Clemente dos Santos.

Quarter-finals

2016 Rio de Janeiro 

As the host nation, the team competed in 2016 Summer Paralympics, with competition from Thursday 8 September to finals on Friday 16 September 2016, in the temporary Future Arena, Rio de Janeiro, Brazil.

Quarter-finals

Semi-finals

Finals

2020 Tokyo 

The team competed in the 2020 Summer Paralympics, with competitionfrom Wednesday 25 August to finals on Friday 3 September 2021, in the Makuhari Messe arena, Chiba, Tokyo, Japan.

Round-robin

 Quarter-finals

 Semi-finals

 Bronze medal match

World Championships

2002 Rio de Janeiro 

The team competed in the 2002 World Championships, in Rio de Janeiro, Brazil, from 30 August 2002 to 8 September 2002. The team was one of ten teams participating, and they finished eighth overall.

2006 Spartanburg  

The team competed in the 2006 World Championships, in July 2006, in Spartanburg, South Carolina, United States of America.  There were sixteen men's and thirteen women's teams.  The team did not make the semi-finals.

2014 Espoo 

The team competed in the 2014 World Championships from 30 June to 5 July 2014, in Espoo, Finland.  They placed fifth.

2018 Malmö 

The team competed in the 2014 World Championships from 30 June to 5 July 2014, in Espoo, Finland.  Athletes for the event were: Alaine Lilian da Silva Marques, Ana Carolina Duarte Custódio Streets, Gleyse Priscila Portiolli Henrique, Jéssica Gomes Vitorino, Ana Gabriely Brito Assunção, and Moniza Aparecida de Lima.  Coming first in Pool D, they beat Australia 5:2 in the quarter-finals, but were beaten by Turkey in the semi-finals, 2:5.  They then beat Canada 7:2 for the bronze medal.

2022 Matosinhos 

The team competed in the 2022 World Championships from 7 to 16 December 2022, at the Centro de Desportos e Congressos de Matosinhos, Portugal.  There were sixteen men's and sixteen women's teams.  They placed fifth in Pool B, and ninth in final standings.

IBSA World Games

2003 Quebec City  

The 2003 IBSA World Games were held in Quebec City, Canada with 10 teams competing.  The first stage was pool play with 5 teams per pool and the top two teams in each pool advancing to the next round. The team made it out of the round robin round.

2007 Sao Paulo 

The team competed in the 2003 IBSA World Games, from 28 July 2007 to 8 August 2007, in Sao Paulo, Brazil.  The women's goalball competition included thirteen teams.  The competition was a 2008 Summer Paralympics qualifying event. Ana Carolina Duarte led the competition in scoring with 27 points.  Brazil finished second after losing to Finland in overtime.

2011 Antalya  

The team competed in the 2011 IBSA World Games from 1 to 10 April 2011, in Antalya, Turkey, organised by the Turkish Blind Sports Federation.  There were fifteen men's and fourteen women's teams.  They placed eleventh in the final standings.

Regional championships 

The team competes in the IBSA America goalball region.  The winner of the championships usually qualifies for a berth at the World Championships or the Paralympic Games.

2005 São Paulo 

The team competed at the 2005 IBSA Goalball Americas Regional Championships which were part of the Fourth IBSA Pan-American Games, the competition being from Monday 5 September 2005 to Friday 9 September 2005, in São Paulo, Brazil.  There were five men's and three women's teams.

There were three women's teams competing: Brazil, Canada, and USA.  Brazil finished first, with the United States second and Canada third.

2011 Guadalajara 

The team competed at the 2011 Parapan American Games from 13 to 19 November 2011, at the San Rafael Gymnasium in Guadalajara, Mexico.  There were five women's teams: Brazil, Canada, El Salvador, Mexico, USA.  Athletes were Jéssica Alves, Ana Custódio, Claudia Gonçalves, Gleyse Portioli, Neusimar Santos, and Márcia Vieira.

Brazil came second to USA in the finals.

2013 Colorado Springs 

The team competed at the 2013 Parapan American Games (which also hosted the 2013 IBSA World Youth Championships) from 11 to 14 July 2013, at Colorado Springs, Colorado, USA.  There were three women's teams: Brazil, Canada, USA.

Brazil took the silver medal, losing to USA.

2015 Toronto 

The team competed at the 2015 Parapan American Games from 8 August 2015 to 15 August 2015, at the Mississauga Sports Centre, Toronto, Ontario, Canada.  There were six women's teams: Brazil, Canada, El Salvador, Guatemala, Nicaragua, USA.

Brazil took the gold medal, beating USA.

2017 São Paulo 

The team competed at the 2017 IBSA Goalball Americas Championships from Wednesday 29 November 2017 to Sunday 3 December 2017, at São Paulo, Brazil.  There were six women's teams: Brazil, Canada, Costa Rica, Mexico, Peru, USA.

Brazil took silver, with Canada taking the gold.

2019 Lima 

The team competed at the 2019 Parapan American Games from 23 August 2019 to 1 September 2019, at the Miguel Grau Coliseum, Lima, Peru.  This championships was a qualifier for the 2020 Paralympic Games.  There were six women's teams: Brazil, Canada, Costa Rica, Mexico, Peru, USA.

Brazil took gold, beating USA.

2022 São Paulo 

Due to the ongoing COVID-19 pandemic, the IBSA America championship moved from 6 to 13 November 2021, to 18 to 22 February 2022.  The event was held at the Centro de Treinamento Paralímpico (Paralympic Training Center) in São Paulo.  This championships was a qualifier for the 2022 World Championships.

There are twelve women's teams: Argentina, Brazil, Canada, Chile, Colombia, Costa Rica, Guatemala, Mexico, Nicaragua, Peru, USA, Venezuela.

In the round-robin section, the team mercied four of their five competitors (Venezuela (10:0), Colombia (11:1), Guatemala (10:0), and Peru (10:0)), and beating Mexico (8:1).  In the quarter-finals they mercied Chile (10:0), narrowly beat USA in the semi-finals (5:4), before beating Canada (5:0) to take the gold medal.  The national men's team also achieved gold medal success.

Competitive history 

The table below contains individual game results for the team in international matches and competitions.

Goal scoring by competition

See also 

 Disabled sports
 Brazil men's national goalball team
 Brazil at the Paralympics

References

Goalball women's
National women's goalball teams
Brazil at the Paralympics
Goalball in Brazil
Goalball in the Americas